The 1991 Campeonato Paulista da Primeira Divisão de Futebol Profissional was the 90th season of São Paulo's top professional football league. São Paulo won the championship by the 17th time. São Bento was relegated.

Championship
The twenty-eight teams of the championship were divided into two groups of fourteen teams. The Green Group comprised the teams that had qualified to the Third Phase and the winners of the Second Phase's two groups in the previous year, and the Yellow Group comprised other the ten teams that had been eliminated in the Second Phase, and the four teams that had been promoted from the second level. The bottom team in the Yellow Group would be relegated.

The Second phase's eight teams were divided into two groups of four, with every team playing twice against the teams of its own group and the winners of each group qualifying to the Finals.

First phase

Green Group

Yellow Group

Second phase

Group 1

Group 2

Finals

|}

References

Campeonato Paulista seasons
Paulista